Montcau is a mountain of Catalonia, Spain. This mountain is part of the Sant Llorenç del Munt massif. It is accessible from Terrassa or Navarcles or Sant Llorenç Savall.

More info of Montcau

See also
Sant Llorenç del Munt
Catalan Pre-Coastal Range

References

Mountains of Catalonia